IBM Open Class (IOC) is an IBM C++ product originally developed by Kevin Leong and originally known under several names in the C++ industry, including ICL (IBM Class Library), UICL (User Interface Class Library), and OCL (Open Class Library).

IOC was an extensive set of C++ classes used to build CLI and GUI applications which could then be easily cross-compiled to OS/2, Microsoft Windows, and AIX. IOC also formed the basis for IBM's VisualAge for C++ graphical application builder. The non-GUI portions of IOC were available for z/OS and OS/400.

History of IOC 

The IOC was included as part of IBM's C++ compiler environment. Applications developed with IOC could be distributed with a royalty-free runtime, or could be statically linked against the IOC libraries. Initially only available for OS/2, the IOC was eventually made available for Windows, AIX, z/OS, and OS/400. Support for the OS/2 and Windows VisualAge for C++ compiler—as well as the accompanying IOC—was officially withdrawn by IBM on April 27, 2001. IOC was removed from z/OS 1.9, introduced in 2007.

C/Set++ v2.01 for OS/2 (1993)
VisualAge C++ for OS/2, version 3.0
VisualAge for C++ for Windows, version 3.5
C and C++ Compilers for OS/2, AIX, and for Windows NT, version 3.6
C and C++ Compilers for OS/2 and Windows, version 3.65 (1998?)
VisualAge C++ Professional for OS/2 and Windows NT, version 4.0 (1998)

Examples 
The most widely recognized example of a simple application that uses the IOC is hello world:

  #include <iframe.hpp>
 int main()
 {
     IFrameWindow frame ("Hello, World!");
     frame.showModally();
 }
Other examples of commonly used IOC classes and methods include:

  #include <istring.hpp>
 IString someText ("hello world");

  #include <icmdhdr.hpp>
 virtual Boolean MyHandler::command (ICommandEvent &event);

Notes
 IBM's Withdrawal Announcement #901-013 (announced on January 23, 2001, effective on April 27, 2001)

External links
news://ibm.software.vacpp.openclass
 (C++ Class Library: Power GUI Programming with CSet++)
 (Power GUI Programming with VisualAge for C++)

Open Class
OS/2 software
Windows software
1993 software
C++ libraries